A constitutional referendum was held in Guinea on 11 November 2001. The new constitution would remove presidential term limits, and increase the term from five to seven years. It was approved by 98.36% of voters, and although boycotted by the opposition, turnout was reported to be 87.2% turnout.

Results

References

2001
2001 referendums
2001 in Guinea
Constitutional referendums